Toney G. Penna (January 15, 1908 – August 6, 1995) was an Italian-American professional golfer and designer of golf clubs and gear.  He won four events on the PGA Tour between 1937 and 1947. He introduced new lines of golf clubs and was the holder of four patents for golf clubs.  Many of these clubs are considered collectors' items: some are still in production. He also introduced the use of color to both clubs and to golf accessories, such as carrying bags.

Character
Penna was born in Naples, Italy. He grew up in Harrison, New York and also lived in Dayton and Cincinnati, Ohio.  By 1946, Penna had moved to Delray Beach, Florida.

Starting out in golf by being a caddy, Penna was known for his personality and individualism as much as for his golfing abilities.  He was often a critic of his high-ranking golf contemporaries, and published a table illustrating his thoughts about the strengths and weaknesses of each in his autobiography. With a ready temper but also a sense of humor, Penna's work as a golf pro brought him into contact with Dean Martin, Bing Crosby, and Bob Hope, among others.

Perry Como was a long-time friend of Penna's.  Before his permanent move to Florida, Como often came to golf with him on the weekends after completing his weekly television program. After a tournament where Penna beat Como, he remarked that the only thing that was keeping him from returning to the large professional golf tours was his lack of hair.  A week later, Penna received a package from Como; inside was a hairpiece and a note which said "Go!".

Penna was a longtime employee and representative of the MacGregor Golf Company. After years of working for MacGregor, Penna started his own company and manufactured his own golf clubs. A stretch of road in Jupiter, Florida, where his company was located is named after him.  Penna used the spelling of his name as an attention-getter, and was known for having a taste for fine clothing. Penna displayed an ability for concentrated problem-solving in improving golf club performance which led to his success as an equipment representative, a golf pro, and also as the producer of his own line of golf clubs.

With his brother, Charley, Penna was associated with the Beverly and with the Calumet Country Clubs, both near Chicago; at one time both brothers were playing professionally. Penna died in Palm Beach Gardens, Florida in 1995 at the age of 87.

Professional wins

PGA Tour wins (4)
1937 Pennsylvania Open Championship
1938 Kansas City Open
1946 Richmond Open
1947 Atlanta Open

Other wins
this list is incomplete
1948 North and South Open

Results in major championships

NT = no tournament
WD = withdrew
CUT = missed the half-way cut
R64, R32, R16, QF, SF = round in which player lost in PGA Championship match play
"T" indicates a tie for a place

Summary

Most consecutive cuts made – 20 (1940 Masters – 1949 Masters)
Longest streak of top-10s – 2 (twice)

References

Further reading

Italian male golfers
American male golfers
PGA Tour golfers
Golfers from New York (state)
Golfers from Ohio
Golfers from Florida
Sportspeople from Naples
People from Harrison, New York
Sportspeople from Dayton, Ohio
Sportspeople from Cincinnati
Sportspeople from Delray Beach, Florida
Italian emigrants to the United States
1908 births
1995 deaths